The Kamo is a river in Krasnoyarsk Krai, Russia. It is a left tributary of the Podkamennaya Tunguska. The river is 339 kilometres long and its basin drains a surface of 14,500 km².

See also 
 List of rivers of Russia

References

Rivers of Krasnoyarsk Krai